Anna Docherty (born 20 July 2000) is a British track cyclist.

Cycling career
Docherty became a four times British champion after winning the Team Pursuit Championship at the 2020 British National Track Championships. She had previously won the British National Madison Championships in 2017 and 2019.
Docherty represented Team GB in June 2019 at the European Games in Minsk.

References

2000 births
Living people
British female cyclists
British track cyclists
21st-century British women